J2 Communications was a video/television production and distribution company that was founded in 1986 by James P. Jimirro, who had previously been the founding president of the Disney Channel and then a CBS executive. J2 Communications distributed ITC Entertainment titles on VHS at one point in the late 1980s and also distributed Dorf, a comedy series starring Tim Conway.

In 1990, J2 Communications bought National Lampoon magazine and all its related properties from the then owners Daniel Grodnik and Tim Matheson, who had acquired the magazine in a hostile takeover in 1989. J2 Communications went on to make money by licensing out the brand name "National Lampoon" to other companies who wished to make films and similar projects.
J2 Communications was contractually obliged to publish at least one new issue of the magazine per year in order to retain the rights to the  "National Lampoon" name. The company showed very little interest in the magazine itself; throughout the 1990s, the number of issues per year varied unpredictably. In 1991 there was an attempt at monthly publication; nine issues were produced. Only two issues were released in 1992. This was followed by one issue in 1993, five in 1994, and three in 1995. After that the magazine was published only once a year for three years, the last issue being November 1998. After this the contract was renegotiated, and J2 Communications was then prohibited from publishing issues of the magazine. J2, however, still owned the rights to the brand name "National Lampoon", which it continued to franchise out to other users.

In 2002 the company J2 Communications was sold to Daniel Laikin and renamed "National Lampoon Inc.". James P. Jimirro stayed on as CEO until January 2005.

References

External links
 An oral history interview with James P. Jimirro
 Los Angeles article from March 7 2001 about sale of the company
 Short article at investing.business week.com
 Some info at Reuters.com

Film production companies of the United States
Film distributors of the United States
Home video companies of the United States
Television production companies of the United States